The 2021 European Taekwondo Olympic Qualification Tournament for the Tokyo Olympic Games took place in Sofia, Bulgaria. The tournament was held from 7 to 8 May, 2021. Each country could enter a maximum of 2 male and 2 female divisions with only one athlete in each division. The winner and runner-up athletes per division qualified for the Olympic Games under their NOC.

Qualification summary

Results

Men

−58 kg
7 May

−68 kg
8 May

−80 kg
7 May

+80 kg
8 May

Women

−49 kg
7 May

−57 kg
8 May

−67 kg
7 May

+67 kg
8 May

References

 1st Day Results

External links
 World Taekwondo Federation

Olympic Qualification
Taekwondo qualification for the 2020 Summer Olympics
European Taekwondo Olympic Qualification Tournament
European Taekwondo Olympic Qualification Tournament